Naked Ape may refer to:

Biology
 The Naked Ape, a 1967 book on human evolutionary history by Desmond Morris
 Human (idiomatic)
 Pre-humans, in human evolution that were hairless

Other uses
 Naked Ape (band), a Swedish indie/electronica band
 The Naked Ape (film), a 1973 American comedy film
 Sirens (2011 TV series), a British comedy-drama series, working title Naked Apes